The 1992 Gloucester City Council election took place on 5 May 1992 to elect members of Gloucester City Council in England. It was still a No Overall Control council.

Results  

|}

Ward results

Barnwood

Barton

Eastgate

Hucclecote

Kingsholm

Linden

Longlevens

Matson

Podsmead

Tuffley

Westgate

References

1992 English local elections
1992
1990s in Gloucestershire